The Duramax I6 engine is a diesel engine available in select models of General Motors light-duty trucks and SUVs. Applications include the Chevrolet Silverado/GMC Sierra 1500, Chevrolet Suburban/GMC Yukon XL, Chevrolet Tahoe/GMC Yukon, and Cadillac Escalade (both short wheelbase and ESV). The engine was developed together with Opel, who are manufacturing three- and four-cylinder versions displacing 1.5 and 2.0 liters, using the same engine architecture.

Engine details
Displacement: 3.0L
Configuration: I6
Horsepower: 277-305 hp  @ 3750 rpm
Torque: 460-495 ft-lb  @ 1500 rpm
RPO code: LM2(until 2022), LZ0(2023-present)
Intercooler: liquid-to-air
Block: Aluminum
Head: Aluminum
Crank: Forged Steel
Rods: Forged
Pistons: Hypereutetic cast aluminum alloy
Cylinder liners: Iron

The engine's timing components are located at the rear of the engine, and feature timing chains to drive the camshafts and high pressure fuel pump, and a wet belt to drive the oil pump.

Most of the development and engineering work for the LM2 Duramax, as well as primary calibration took place in Turin, Italy. The engine is being produced at the GM Flint Engine Plant in Flint, Michigan, USA. Multiple testing has shown 40 MPG is possible when hypermiling.

References

General Motors engines
Diesel engines by model
Straight-six engines